

Events 
 January–March 
 January 1 – Swedish biologist Carl Linnaeus (Carl von Linné) publishes in Stockholm the first volume (Animalia) of the 10th edition of Systema Naturae, the starting point of modern zoological nomenclature, introducing binomial nomenclature for animals to his established system of Linnaean taxonomy. Among the first examples of his system of identifying an organism by genus and then species, Linnaeus identifies the lamprey with the name Petromyzon marinus. He introduces the term Homo sapiens. (Date of January 1 assigned retrospectively.)
 January 20 – At Cap-Haïtien in Haiti, former slave turned rebel François Mackandal is executed by the French colonial government by being burned at the stake.
 January 22 – Russian troops under the command of William Fermor invade East Prussia and capture Königsberg with 34,000 soldiers; although the city is later abandoned by Russia after the Seven Years' War ends, the city again comes under Russian control in 1945 during World War II and is now named Kaliningrad.
 February 22 – A fleet of 158 British Royal Navy warships, under the command of Admiral Edward Boscawen, departs from Plymouth toward North America in an effort to conquer the French Canadian territories of New France.  Many of the sailors die of nutritional deficiencies along the way, including the scurvy that kills 26 of the crew of HMS Pembroke, captained by future world explorer James Cook on his first long voyage.
 February 23 – Jonathan Edwards, the famed English theologian who had assumed the presidency of what is now Princeton University only a week earlier, sets an example for students and faculty by publicly receiving an inoculation against smallpox. Unfortunately, the vaccine contains live smallpox; Edwards develops the disease and dies on March 22 at the age of 54.  
 March 16 – Members of the Comanche Nation loot and destroy the Spanish Mission Santa Cruz de San Sabá (near modern-day Menard, Texas) and kill eight of the people there, including the mission leader, Father Alonso Giraldo de Terreros.

 April–June 
 April 29 – Battle of Cuddalore: A British fleet under Sir George Pocock engages the French fleet of Anne Antoine, Comte d'Aché indecisively near Madras.
 May 21 – Seven Years' War – French and Indian War: Mary Campbell is abducted from her home in Pennsylvania by members of the Lenape Nation.
 June 8 – Seven Years' War – French and Indian War: Siege of Louisbourg: James Wolfe's attack at Louisbourg, Nova Scotia, commences.

 June 9–June 10 – Spanish-Barbary Wars – Battle of Cape Palos: a Spanish squadron of three ships of the line defeats a Barbary squadron made up of a ship of the line and a frigate.
 June 23 – Seven Years' War – Battle of Krefeld: Anglo-Hanoverian forces under Ferdinand of Brunswick defeat the French.
 June 30 – Seven Years' War – Battle of Domstadtl: Austrian forces under Ernst Gideon von Laudon and Joseph von Siskovits rout an enormous convoy with supplies for the Prussian army, guarded by strong troops of Hans Joachim von Zieten.

 July–September 
 July 6 
 Pope Clement XIII succeeds Pope Benedict XIV, as the 248th pope.
 Seven Years' War – Battle of Bernetz Brook: British troops defeat the French.
 July 8 – Seven Years' War: French and Indian War: French forces hold Fort Carillon against the British at Ticonderoga, New York.
 July 25 – Seven Years' War – French and Indian War: The island battery at Fortress Louisbourg is silenced, and all French warships are destroyed or taken.
 August 3 – Seven Years' War – Battle of Negapatam: Off the coast of India, Admiral Pocock again engages d'Aché's French fleet, this time with more success.

 August 25 – Seven Years' War – Battle of Zorndorf: Frederick defeats the Russian army of Count Wilhelm Fermor near the Oder.
 August 27 – Seven Years' War – British troops under the command of Colonel John Bradstreet capture Fort Frontenac (near the site of what is now Kingston, Ontario) from the French.
 September 3 – Távora affair: Joseph I of Portugal survives an assassination attempt.
 September 14 – Seven Years' War – French and Indian War: Battle of Fort Duquesne: A British attack on Fort Duquesne (modern-day Pittsburgh) is defeated.

 October–December 
 October 14 – Seven Years' War: Battle of Hochkirch: Frederick loses a hard-fought battle against the Austrians under Marshal Leopold von Daun, who besieges Dresden.
 November 25 – Seven Years' War: French and Indian War: French forces abandon Fort Duquesne to the British, who then name the area Pittsburgh. 
 December 13 – The ship Duke William sinks in the North Atlantic, with the loss of over 360 lives, while deporting Acadians from Prince Edward Island to France.
 December 25 – Halley's Comet appears for the first time, after Halley's identification of it.

 Date unknown 
 The French build the first European settlement in what becomes Erie County, New York, at the mouth of Buffalo Creek.
 A fire destroys parts of Christiania, Norway.

 Marquis Gabriel de Lernay, a French officer captured during the Seven Years' War, establishes a military lodge in Berlin, with the help of Baron de Printzen, master of The Three Globes Lodge at Berlin, and Philipp Samuel Rosa, a disgraced former pastor.
 Okadaya (岡田屋), predecessor of AEON, a multiple retailer group, founded in Yokkaichi, Japan.
 J. R. Geigy, predecessor of Novartis, a global pharmaceutical brand, founded in Basel, Switzerland.

Births 
 January 6 – Charles Ganilh, French economist, politician (d. 1836)
 January 9 – George Leveson-Gower, 1st Duke of Sutherland (d. 1833)
 January 11 – François Louis Bourdon, French Revolutionary politician (d. 1797)
 January 17 – Marie Anne Simonis, Belgian textile industrialist (d. 1831)
 January 20 – Marie-Anne Pierrette Paulze, French chemist (d. 1836)
 January 24 – Frederick Ponsonby, 3rd Earl of Bessborough (d. 1844)
 February 1
 David Ochterlony, Massachusetts-born general with the East India Company (d. 1825)
 February 3 
 Francis Napier, 8th Lord Napier of Great Britain (d. 1823)
 Vasily Kapnist, Ukrainian poet, playwright (d. 1823)
 February 4 – George Thicknesse, 19th Baron Audley (d. 1818)
 February 10 – Amalia Holst, German writer, intellectual, and feminist (d. 1829)
 February 17 – John Pinkerton, British antiquarian (d. 1826)
 February 28 – Nicolas François, Count Mollien, French financier (d. 1850)
 March 9 – Franz Joseph Gall, German pioneering neuroanatomist (d. 1828)
 March 12 – Leopold Karel, Count of Limburg Stirum (d. 1840)
 March 15 – Magdalene Sophie Buchholm, Norwegian poet (d. 1826)
 April 4 
 John Hoppner, English portrait-painter (d. 1810)
 Pierre-Paul Prud'hon, French painter (d. 1823)
 April 16 – Christian Karl August Ludwig von Massenbach, Prussian soldier (d. 1827)
 April 22 – Francisco Javier Castaños, 1st Duke of Bailén, Spanish general (d. 1852)
 April 23 
 Alexander Hood, British Royal Navy officer (k. 1798)
 Alexander Cochrane, British Royal Navy officer (d. 1832)
 Philip Gidley King, British Royal Navy officer, colonial administrator (d. 1808)
 April 27 – Charles Dumont de Sainte-Croix, French zoologist (d. 1830)

 April 28 – James Monroe, fifth President of the United States (d. 1831)
 April 29 – Georg Carl von Döbeln, Swedish officer, general and war hero (d. 1820)
 April 30
 Emmanuel Vitale, Maltese military leader (d. 1802)
 Jane West, English writer (d. 1852)

 May 6 
 Maximilien de Robespierre, French revolutionary (d. 1794)
 André Masséna, Napoleonic general, Marshal of France (d. 1817)
 May 8 – John Heath, U.S. Representative for Virginia (d. 1810)
 May 15 – Thomas Taylor, English neoplatonist translator (d. 1835)
 May 17 
 Sir John St Aubyn, 5th Baronet, English fossil collector (d. 1839)
 Honoré IV, Prince of Monaco (d. 1819)
 June 19 – Raffaello Sanzio Morghen, Italian engraver (d. 1833)
 June 29 – Clotilde Tambroni, Italian philologist, linguist (d. 1817)
 July 25 – Elizabeth Hamilton, English writer (d. 1816)
 July 31 – Rosalie de Constant, Swiss naturalist (d. 1834) 
 July 31 – Jeremiah Colegrove, U.S. farmer, manufacturer and soldier (d. 1836)
 August 5 – Emperor Go-Momozono of Japan (d. 1779)
 August 14 – Carle Vernet, French painter (d. 1835)

 August 24 
 Thomas Picton, British soldier, colonial governor (k. 1815)
 August 25 – Israel Pellew, English naval officer (d. 1832)
 September 9 – Alexander Nasmyth, Scottish portrait and landscape painter (d. 1840)
 September 10 – Hannah Webster Foster, U.S. novelist (d. 1840)
 September 18 – Louis Friant, French Napoleonic soldier (d. 1829)
 September 20 – Jean-Jacques Dessalines, leader of the Haitian Revolution (d. 1806)

 September 21 
 Antoine Isaac Silvestre de Sacy, French linguist, orientalist (d. 1838)
 Christopher Gore, U.S. lawyer, politician (d. 1827)
 September 25 – Maria Anna Thekla Mozart called Marianne, known as Bäsle ("little cousin"), cousin of Wolfgang Amadeus Mozart (d. 1841)
 September 26 – Cosme Argerich, Argentine Surgeon General (d. 1820)

 September 29
 Horatio Nelson, 1st Viscount Nelson, British admiral (d. 1805)
 Fanny von Arnstein, Austrian salonnière (d. 1802)
 October 5 – Seymour Fleming, British noblewoman (d. 1818) 
 October 6 – Watkin Tench, British Marine officer (d. 1833)
 October 11 – Heinrich Wilhelm Matthias Olbers, German astronomer (d. 1840)
 October 15 – Johann Heinrich von Dannecker, German sculptor (d. 1841)

 October 16 – Noah Webster, U.S. lexicographer (d. 1843)
 October 22/6 – Vincenzo Dandolo, Italian chemist, agriculturist (d. 1819)
 October 28 – John Sibthorp, English botanist (d. 1796)
 October 28 – Joseph-François-Louis-Charles de Damas, French general (d. 1829)
 October 31 – Thomas Gisborne, Anglican priest, abolitionist (d. 1846)
 November 5 – Louis-Marie Aubert du Petit-Thouars, French botanist (d. 1831)
 November 11 
 Carl Friedrich Zelter, German composer (d. 1832)
 Caleb P. Bennett, U.S. soldier, politician (d. 1836)
 November 16 – Peter Andreas Heiberg, Danish author, philologist (d. 1841)
 December 5 – George Beauclerk, 4th Duke of St Albans (d. 1787)
 December 9 – Richard Colt Hoare, English antiquarian, archaeologist (d. 1838)
 December 21 – Jean Baptiste Eblé, French general (d. 1812)

Date unknown 
 Georges Antoine Chabot, French jurist, statesman (d. 1819)
 Nicholas Fish, U.S. Revolutionary soldier (d. 1833)
 Anthimos Gazis, Greek scholar, philosopher (d. 1828)
 Samuel Hardy, U.S. lawyer and statesman from Virginia (d. 1785)
 Jamphel Gyatso, 8th Dalai Lama of Tibet (d. 1804)
 Charles Lee, U.S. Attorney General (d. 1815)
 Samuel Sterett, American politician, U.S. Representative for Maryland (d. 1833)
 Marie-Claire Heureuse Félicité, Empress of Haiti (d. 1858)

Probable 
 Kamehameha I, King of Hawaii (d. c. 1819)

Deaths 
 January 7 – Allan Ramsay, Scottish poet (b. 1686)
 January 17 – James Hamilton, 6th Duke of Hamilton, Scottish peer (b. 1724)
 January 18 – François Nicole, French mathematician (b. 1683)
 February 10 – Thomas Ripley, English architect (b. 1683)
 March 2 – Pierre Guérin de Tencin, French cardinal (b. 1679)
 March 6 – Henry Vane, 1st Earl of Darlington, English politician (b. c. 1705)
 March 18 
 Matthew Hutton, Archbishop of Canterbury (b. 1693)
 Thomas Zebrowski, Lithuanian Jesuit scientist (b. 1714)

 March 22 
 Jonathan Edwards, U.S. minister (b. 1703)
 Richard Leveridge, English bass and composer (b. 1670)
 April 7 – Joseph Blanchard, American soldier (b. 1704)
 April 21 – Francesco Zerafa, Maltese architect (b. 1679)
 April 22 – Antoine de Jussieu, French naturalist (b. 1686)
 April 30 – François d'Agincourt, French composer (b. 1684)
 May 3 – Pope Benedict XIV (b. 1675)
 May 28 – Ernst August II, Duke of Saxe-Weimar and Eisenach (b. 1737)
 June 9 – Antonio de los Reyes Correa, Puerto Rican soldier
 June 12 – Prince Augustus William of Prussia (b. 1722)
 July 6 – George Howe, 3rd Viscount Howe, British general (in battle) (b. c. 1725)

 July 7 – Marthanda Varma, Rani of Attingal (b. 1706)
 July 15 – Ambrosius Stub, Danish poet (b. 1705)
 July 18 – Duncan Campbell, Scottish soldier
 August 2 – George Booth, 2nd Earl of Warrington (b. 1675)
 August 15 – Pierre Bouguer, French mathematician (b. 1698)
 August 17 – Stepan Fyodorovich Apraksin, Russian soldier (b. 1702)
 August 23 – Ulrika Eleonora von Düben, Swedish lady in waiting (b. 1722)
 August 27 – Barbara of Portugal, Princess of Portugal and Queen of Spain (b. 1711)
 September 5 – Dmitry Ivanovich Vinogradov, Russian chemist (b. c. 1720)
 September 23 – John FitzPatrick, 1st Earl of Upper Ossory (b. 1719)
 October 2 (bur.) – Philip Southcote, English landscape gardener (b. 1698)
 October 12 – Richard Molesworth, 3rd Viscount Molesworth, British field marshal (b. 1680)

 October 14
 Wilhelmine of Prussia, Margravine of Brandenburg-Bayreuth, daughter of Friedrich Wilhelm I of Prussia (b. 1709)
 James Francis Edward Keith, Scottish soldier and Prussian field marshal (b. 1696)
 October 20 – Charles Spencer, 3rd Duke of Marlborough, British politician (b. 1706)
 October 25/8 – Theophilus Cibber, English actor (b. 1703)
 November 5 – Hans Egede, Norwegian Lutheran missionary (b. 1686)
 November 12 – John Cockburn, Scottish politician
 November 20 – Johan Helmich Roman, Swedish composer (b. 1694)
 November 22 – Richard Edgcumbe, 1st Baron Edgcumbe, English politician (b. 1680)
 November 27 – Senesino, Italian singer (b. 1686)
 December 5 – Johann Friedrich Fasch, German composer (b. 1688)

 December 12 – Françoise de Graffigny, French lettrist (b. 1695)
 December 16 – Andrzej Stanisław Załuski, Polish-Lithuanian bishop (b. 1695)
 December 17 – Charles Butler, 1st Earl of Arran (b. 1671)
 December 25 – James Hervey, English clergyman, writer (b. 1714)
 December 26 – François Joseph Lagrange-Chancel, French dramatist, satirist (b. 1677)

Date unknown 
 François Mackandal, Haitian revolutionary leader, burned at the stake
 Nathaniel Meserve, American shipwright (b. 1704)
 Hyder Ali and his Sepoy capture Bangalore from "Khande Rao of the Maratha Confederacy". (Part of the Seven Years' War).
 Verónica II Guterres, African monarch

References